BNS Durvedya  is a Type 024 missile boat of Bangladesh Navy. The ship served Bangladesh Navy from 1983 to 2017.

Career
BNS Durvedya was commissioned on 10 November 1983. In the cyclone of 1991, the ship was damaged and later on repaired. She was decommissioned from the Bangladesh Navy on 30 March 2017. Later on she was scrapped.

Design
The ship carries two SY-1 anti-ship missiles. Besides, it also carries two Type 61 25 mm guns. For surface search, it has a Type 352 Square Tie radar.

References

Ships of the Bangladesh Navy
Missile boats of the Bangladesh Navy